RNK may refer to:

 Ram Nath Kovind, 14th President of India
 Roanoke station (Virginia)
 RNK Split, Croatian football club